The  was one of the wartime armaments expansion plans of the Imperial Japanese Navy (IJN).

Background
In September 1942, after being defeated in the Battle of Midway, the IJN drew up a new armaments expansion plan. This plan was combined by the 5th Naval Armaments Supplement Programme and the 6th Naval Armaments Supplement Programme to build the aircraft carriers rapidly. The main article was to build 20 aircraft carriers, and removed all battleships and heavy cruisers. They had approved 412 vessels, 1,150,000 tons. However, most of plans were not achieved. Until the end of the war only 60 vessels from this plan were completed.

Table of vessels

See also
1st Naval Armaments Supplement Programme (Maru 1 Keikaku, 1931)
2nd Naval Armaments Supplement Programme (Maru 2 Keikaku, 1934)
3rd Naval Armaments Supplement Programme (Maru 3 Keikaku, 1937)
4th Naval Armaments Supplement Programme (Maru 4 Keikaku, 1939)
Temporal Naval Armaments Supplement Programme (Maru Rin Keikaku, 1940)
Rapidly Naval Armaments Supplement Programme (Maru Kyū Keikaku, 1941)
Additional Naval Armaments Supplement Programme (Maru Tui Keikaku, 1941)
5th Naval Armaments Supplement Programme (Maru 5 Keikaku, 1941)
6th Naval Armaments Supplement Programme (Maru 6 Keikaku, 1942)
Wartime Naval Armaments Supplement Programme (Maru Sen Keikaku, 1944)

References
改マル5計画 (ja)

Naval Armaments Supplement Programme
Naval Armaments Supplement Programme